Gonçalo Coutinho (born 15th-century) was a Portuguese nobleman, Count of Marialva. and Constable of Portugal.

Biography 

His parents were Vasco Fernandes Coutinho and Maria de Sousa. Gonçalo was married to Beatriz de Melo, daughter of Martim Afonso de Melo and Briolanja de Sousa.

Gonçalo Coutinho was grandson of Gonçalo Vasques Coutinho and his first wife Leonor Gonçalves de Azevedo.

References 

15th-century Portuguese people
Portuguese nobility
Portuguese Roman Catholics